ESPN Radio 950 may refer to:

 ESPN Radio 950 serving the Philadelphia, PA market
 ESPN Radio 950 serving the Richmond, VA market
 ESPN Radio 950 serving the Indianapolis, IN market